Diaphania reductalis is a moth in the family Crambidae. It was described by Achille Guenée in 1854 and is found in Brazil.

References

Diaphania
Endemic fauna of Brazil
Moths described in 1854
Taxa named by Achille Guenée